Nicolaos Ch. Nikolaidis (in French Nicolas Nicolaïdès; (1826 - July 11, 1889) was an author, mechanical engineer, mathematician, soldier, and professor.  He was a pioneer in 19th-century Greek mathematics introducing modern European mathematics to the Greek world.  He went to school at Evelpidon and studied in France at the École des ponts Paris Tech and École Polytechnique.  His professors in France included Joseph Bertrand and Adhémar Jean Claude Barré de Saint-Venant.  While in France he was exposed to the complex mathematics prevalent at the time.  He wrote papers on geometry and kinematics.  He was exposed to the works of Jacques Charles François Sturm, Giovanni Fagnano, Colin Maclaurin, Joseph Bertrand, and Jacques Antoine Charles Bresse.  He integrated some of their works into his mathematical literature.  He participated in the Cretan revolt in 1866 and was the Commander of the 174th Battalion of Verville during the Franco-Prussian War in 1870.  He became a professor at University of Athens in 1871.  His memories published in 1874 feature most of his mathematical papers it is over four hundred pages entitled Analectes, ou Mémoires et Notes sur les Diverses Parties des Mathématiques.  By 1881,  he retired from the University of Athens  due to an illness.  He died on July 11, 1889.  He was about 63 years old.  He influenced countless French and Greek mathematicians.  Some included Cyparissos Stephanos, John Hazzidakis and Vassilios Lakon.

Biography 
He was born in 1826 in Tripoli. His father's name was Christodoulos.  His father was a member of an old Greek aristocratic family.  Christodoulos migrated to Switzerland from  Philippopolis.  The family eventually settled in the Peloponnese region of Greece around the time of the Greek War of Independence.  From a young age, Nikolaidis exhibited a higher level of intelligence.  He attended Greece's elite military school known as Evelpidon.  Nikolaidis graduated from the school with honors.  The Greek government sent him to Paris on a scholarship to study with the most brilliant minds of the time.  He studied at the École des ponts Paris Tech and the École Polytechnique.  His professor at the École Polytechnique was Joseph Bertrand.  His classmates at the time were Henri Brocard and Émile Lemoine.  His professor at the  École des ponts Paris Tech was mechanician and mathematician Adhémar Jean Claude Barré de Saint-Venant.  Nikolaidis taught civil engineering and mathematics in France.  He was also affiliated with Charles Hermite, Jacques Antoine Charles Bresse, and Léon Foucault.  He had an academic disagreement with Bresse and Foucault. He published his responses in the French magazine Cosmos.  He abandoned his teaching position at  École des ponts Paris Tech because of his disagreement with Bresse.  In 1863, Nikolaidis published Théorie du Mouvement d'une Figure Plane dans son Plan Application aux Organes des Machines and in  1864 he published his dissertation, Mémoire Sur la Théorie Générale des Surfaces.  By 1865, he had two Phds that same year he returned to Greece and became an instructor at Evelpidon.  Around the same period at 40 years of age, he fought on the side of Crete during the Cretan revolt in 1866.  After the Cretan revolt, he fought on the side of France in the Franco-Prussian War in 1870.  He was the Commander of the 174th Battalion of Verville.  When he returned to Greece he became a professor at the University of Athens in 1871.  Three years later he published an accumulation of his complex mathematical work in French entitled Analectes, ou Mémoires et Notes sur les Diverses Parties des Mathématiques.  Around this period he taught Cyparissos Stephanos.  He inspired the young mathematician.  By 1881, he retired from teaching at the University of Athens due to an illness.  He was about fifty-five years old.  He died eight years later at the age of sixty-three.  He was a member of several organizations including an organization for the encouragement of Greek studies in France.

Mémoire Sur la Théorie Générale des Surfaces

Literary Works

See Also
Stephenson valve gear
Watt steam engine

References

Bibliography 

 

École des Ponts ParisTech alumni
1826 births
1889 deaths
Greek mathematicians
Academic staff of the National and Kapodistrian University of Athens
19th-century Greek scientists
19th-century Greek educators
19th-century Greek mathematicians
People from Tripoli, Greece
19th-century Greek military personnel
Military personnel of the Franco-Prussian War
Hellenic Army officers
École Polytechnique alumni